Lycomorphodes strigosa is a moth of the family Erebidae. It was described by Arthur Gardiner Butler in 1877. It is found in the Brazilian states of Espírito Santo  and São Paulo.

References

 Arctiidae genus list at Butterflies and Moths of the World of the Natural History Museum

Cisthenina
Moths described in 1877